Châu Thành is a rural district of Tien Giang province in the Mekong Delta region of Vietnam. As of 2003 the district had a population of 252,068. The district covers an area of 256 km². The district capital lies at Tân Hiệp.

References

Districts of Tiền Giang province